Dumbrava de Sus may refer to several villages in Romania:

 Dumbrava de Sus, a village in Ribița Commune, Hunedoara County
 Dumbrava de Sus, a village in Dumbrava Commune, Mehedinţi County